Gobindsar is a town located in the Punjab province of India.

References

Populated places in Punjab, India